Banking families are families which have been involved in banking for multiple generations, in the modern era generally as owners or co-owners of banks, often named for their families. Banking families have been important in the history of banking, especially before the 20th century.

Antiquity
House of Egibi of Mesopotamia
Murashu family of Mesopotamia

Modern

See also

 Private bank
 Private banking

References

Banking
Families